Zoran Cvetanović (born June 13, 1958) is a Serbian professional basketball coach.

Coaching career 
Cvetanović began his coaching career with the Radnički women's team in Kragujevac. In 1993, he became the coach for youth teams. In 1996 he moved to senior squad as the head coach. He also had two stints with men's teams from Kragujevac – Zastava and Radnički 034 Group.

Cvetanović spent a part of his coaching career working abroad. He had two stints in Montenegro with Ibon Nikšić and Herceg Novi-based Primorje. In 2011, he was named as a head coach for Ryazan of the Russian Super League 1.

Since 2013, Cvetanović has been working with youth selections of SK MVP in Kragujevac.

In March 2021, Cvetanović was hired as the new head coach for Al-Ahli Benghazi of the Libyan Division I Basketball League.

References

External links 
 Profile at eurobasket.com

1958 births
Living people
KK Radnički KG 06 coaches
KK Radnički 1950 coaches
KK Zastava coaches
KK Sutjeska coaches
Serbian men's basketball coaches
Serbian expatriate basketball people in Libya
Serbian expatriate basketball people in Montenegro
Serbian expatriate basketball people in Russia
Sportspeople from Kragujevac
Yugoslav basketball coaches